Clan Troup is a Scottish clan. The clan is considered an armigerous clan, meaning that it is considered to have had at one time a chief who possessed the chiefly arms; however, no one at present is in possession of such arms. The surname Troup is also considered a sept of Clan Gordon.

History
The name Troup comes from the feudal barony of Troup in Aberdeenshire. Hammelin de Troup was in 1320, arrested for his involvement in a conspiracy against King Robert I of Scotland along with Roger de Mowbray, David, Lord of Brechin and Willian de Soules.

Clan profile
Motto: (Latin: Veritas Vincit - English Truth conquers)
Crest: A hind's head erased, Proper.

Castles
The following is a list of castles known to have been in the ownership of the family.

Cullykhan Castle (Troup Castle), overlooking Cullykhan Bay, Aberdeenshire.
Castle of Findon, overlooking Gamrie Bay, Aberdeenshire.

References

Scottish clans
Armigerous clans